The Clinical Teacher is a medical journal published by John Wiley & Sons. It focuses on clinical education within the health professions. It is abstracted and indexed in Medline and Scopus. The editor-in-chief is Aileen Barrett. The journal was established in 2004.

Editorial board 
Editor in Chief

 Aileen Barrett, Waterford, Ireland

Editorial Office

 Susmitha Raghubabu, Senior Associate Editor, Oxford

Senior Associate Editor

 Sharon Buckley, Birmingham, UK

Associate Editors

 Madawa Chandratilake, Veyangoda, Sri Lanka
 Richard Conn, Belfast, UK
 Gail Jensen, Omaha, USA
 Jennifer Weller-Newton, Melbourne, Australia

Associate Editor, Social Media

 Simon Fleming, London

Production Editor

 Sheryl Acorda, Manila

Editorial Advisory Group

 Monica Moran, Perth, Australia
 Angela Towle, Vancouver, Canada
 Jamie Read, Plymouth, UK
 Vishna Nadarajah, Kuala Lumpur, Malaysia
 Lawrence Tan, Sydney, Australia
 Yvonne Botma, Bloemfontein, South Africa
 Andy Whallett, Dudley, UK

Sub-Editors, Visual Abstracts

 Aqua Asif, Leicester
 Oliver Burton, Newcastle upon Tyne

References 

Education journals
General medical journals